This is the results breakdown of the local elections held in Catalonia on 28 May 1995. The following tables show detailed results in the autonomous community's most populous municipalities, sorted alphabetically.

Overall

City control
The following table lists party control in the most populous municipalities, including provincial capitals (shown in bold). Gains for a party are displayed with the cell's background shaded in that party's colour.

Municipalities

Badalona
Population: 219,340

Barcelona

Population: 1,630,867

Cornellà de Llobregat
Population: 84,142

Girona
Population: 72,333

L'Hospitalet de Llobregat
Population: 266,242

Lleida
Population: 114,234

Mataró
Population: 102,117

Reus
Population: 90,059

Sabadell
Population: 189,006

Sant Cugat del Vallès
Population: 43,373

Santa Coloma de Gramenet
Population: 131,764

Tarragona
Population: 114,630

Terrassa
Population: 161,428

References

Catalonia
1995